Samuel Myeni Hlawe (born 21 July 1952) is a Swazi long-distance runner. He competed in the marathon at the 1984 Summer Olympics and the 1988 Summer Olympics.

References

External links
 

1952 births
Living people
Athletes (track and field) at the 1984 Summer Olympics
Athletes (track and field) at the 1988 Summer Olympics
Swazi male long-distance runners
Swazi male marathon runners
Olympic athletes of Eswatini
Athletes (track and field) at the 1982 Commonwealth Games
Athletes (track and field) at the 1986 Commonwealth Games
Commonwealth Games competitors for Eswatini
World Athletics Championships athletes for Eswatini
Place of birth missing (living people)